Cherokee Township is one of sixteen townships in Cherokee County, Iowa, USA.  As of the 2000 census, its population was 6,073.

Geography
According to the USGS, it contains four cemeteries: Memory Gardens, Mental Health Institute, Mount Calvary and Oak Hill.

References

External links
 US-Counties.com
 City-Data.com

Townships in Cherokee County, Iowa
Townships in Iowa